Pavel Smolyachenko (born 1 December 1991) is an Uzbekistani footballer who currently plays as a midfielder for Uzbekistan Pro League club Istiqlol Fergana.

Club career
In 2010-2012 he played for Neftchi Farg'ona where he managed 4 appearances in his first season. After playing half season for Lokomotiv Tashkent in 2013 he moved back to Neftchi Farg'ona. In 2015, he joined FK Dinamo Samarqand.

International career
In 2011, he made his debut for the Uzbekistan national football team.

Honours

Club

Arema
 Indonesia President's Cup: 2019

References

External links
 

1991 births
Living people
Badak Lampung F.C. players
Uzbekistani people of Russian descent
Uzbekistani people of Ukrainian descent
FK Neftchi Farg'ona players
PFC Lokomotiv Tashkent players
ATM FA players
Arema F.C. players
Malaysia Super League players
Liga 1 (Indonesia) players
Expatriate footballers in Malaysia
Expatriate footballers in Indonesia
Uzbekistani expatriate sportspeople in Malaysia
Uzbekistani expatriate sportspeople in Indonesia
Uzbekistan international footballers
Association football midfielders
Uzbekistani footballers